Sylvio Arriola is a Canadian actor from Quebec. He is most noted for his performance in the film All You Can Eat Buddha, for which he was nominated for Best Supporting Actor at the 6th Canadian Screen Awards in 2018.

Filmography

Film

Television

References

External links

Canadian male film actors
Canadian male television actors
Canadian people of Italian descent
Male actors from Quebec
Living people
Year of birth missing (living people)